Count Frigyes Szapáry de Szapár, Muraszombat et Széchy-Sziget (15 November  1869 – 18 March 1935), was an Austro-Hungarian diplomat of Hungarian origin serving as ambassador at St. Petersburg at the outbreak of World War I and who played a key role during the July Crisis of 1914.

Life 
Born in Budapest on 15 November 1869 into a prominent Hungarian House of Szapáry, as the second son of Count László Szapáry (1831–1883), an Austro-Hungarian general who had played a leading role in the occupation of Bosnia and Herzegovina in 1878, and his wife, Countess Marianne von Grünne (1835-1906), great-granddaughter of Prince Ferdinand von Trauttmansdorff-Weinsberg. He was also a cousin of Count Gyula Szapáry, Prime Minister of Hungary from 1890 to 1892. 

On 27 April 1908, he married Princess Hedwig von Windisch-Graetz (1878–1918), daughter of Alfred Fürst zu Windisch-Grätz and Princess Marie Gabrielle Eleonore von Auersperg (1855–1933). Her father had been Minister President of Austria from 1893 to 1895 and served as President of the Upper Chamber. The couple had four children of which the daughter Marianne (1911–1988) was the mother of Princess Michael of Kent. 

Following studies in law, Count Szapáry joined the Austro-Hungarian foreign service and began his diplomatic career in 1895 as an attaché in Rome, followed by postings in Berlin in 1899 and Munich in 1903. In 1907, he returned to Vienna to serve in the Foreign Ministry at the Ballhausplatz and made a rapid career. Considered a rising star he was appointed as chef de cabinet to Foreign Minister Count Lexa von Aehrenthal in December 1909, a post that allowed him to exercise considerable influence over policy-making. Considered a protégé of Aehrenthal, he belonged to a group of younger diplomats (together with Count von Hoyos and Count von Forgách) who believed that the Dual Monarchy could only be saved from disintegration by a more aggressive and dynamic foreign policy. During the Balkan crisis, he had favoured armed intervention against Serbia. In April 1912, he was appointed to Second Section Chief, which was equivalent to head of the Political Section, in a period of international turmoil. Described as "gifted, quick, hard-working, and a bit mysterious", Aehrenthal's successor Count Berchtold lauded him as for "his outstanding skill in handling political issues and his judgment which far exceeded the norm".   

On 1 October 1913, Count Szapáry was appointed as ambassador at St. Petersburg which was significant in the sense that he was considered a Russophobe and was far less willing to accommodate the Russians than his predecessor had been. However, he did not arrive until early the following year and he presented his credentials to the Tsar first on 14 February 1914. Due to pressing family matters, he had to leave within two weeks and returned to St. Petersburg in mid-April, staying until late May. He returned only in mid-July which meant that the Dual Monarchy lacked its chief diplomat in the Russian capital during the Sarajevo crisis, daily business being conducted by Count Czernin as chargé d'affaires. 

Once back to St. Petersburg on 17 July, Count Szapáry came to play a significant role. At a diplomatic reception on 21 July, he had a sharp exchange with the visiting French President Poincaré and he held several meetings with Russian Foreign Minister Sazonov over the following days. However, as war proved inevitable it eventually fell upon him to deliver the Austro-Hungarian declaration of war against Russia on 6 August, whereupon he left St. Petersburg. 

In 1915, he became a member of the Upper House (Herrenhaus), but played no further major role during the war. He was the maternal grandfather of Princess Michael of Kent.

Count Szapáry died in Vienna on 18 March 1935.

Notes

Works 
 'Das Verhältnis österreich-Ungarns zu Russland' in Eduard Ritter von Steinitz (ed.), Rings um Sasonow, Berlin, Verlag für Kulturpolitik, 1928.
 'Aus den Krisenjahren 1908 bis 1913', in Eduard Ritter von Steinitz (ed.), Erinnerungen an Franz Joseph I, Berlin, Verlag für Kulturpolitik, 1931.

References

External links
 [www.oocities.org/veldes1/szecsen.html 'Friedrich Graf Szápáry von Muraszombat, Szechysziget, und Szápár', Solving Problems Through Force]
'Szapáry Frigyes, gróf', Magyar Életrajzi Lexikon

1869 births
1935 deaths
Austro-Hungarian diplomats of World War I
Austro-Hungarian diplomats
Austrian diplomats
Hungarian diplomats
Hungarian nobility
Frigyes
Knights of the Order of Saint Stephen of Hungary
Ambassadors of Austria-Hungary to Russia